Tereza Pîslaru (née Tamaș; born 28 April 1982 in Roman, Romania) is a Romanian handball player who plays for HCM Roman.

With the Romanian national team she participated at the 2008 Summer Olympics in China, where Romania placed seventh.

References

1982 births
Living people
People from Roman, Romania
Romanian female handball players
Handball players at the 2008 Summer Olympics
Olympic handball players of Romania
Expatriate handball players
Romanian expatriate sportspeople in Serbia